The 1971 football season was São Paulo's 42nd season since club's existence.

Statistics

Scorers

Overall

{|class="wikitable"
|-
|Games played || 60 (22 Campeonato Paulista, 27 Campeonato Brasileiro, 11 Friendly match)
|-
|Games won || 36 (17 Campeonato Paulista, 10 Campeonato Brasileiro, 8 Friendly match)
|-
|Games drawn || 13 (2 Campeonato Paulista, 10 Campeonato Brasileiro, 1 Friendly match)
|-
|Games lost || 11 (3 Campeonato Paulista, 7 Campeonato Brasileiro, 2 Friendly match)
|-
|Goals scored || 84
|-
|Goals conceded || 50
|-
|Goal difference || +34
|-
|Best result || 4–1 (H) v Portuguesa - Campeonato Paulista - 1971.06.194–1 (H) v Botafogo - Campeonato Brasileiro - 1971.12.15
|-
|Worst result || 0–3 (H) v Grêmio - Campeonato Brasileiro - 1971.08.07
|-
|Most appearances || Gilberto Sorriso (59)
|-
|Top scorer || Toninho Guerreiro (31)
|-

Friendlies

I Festival de Futebol do São Paulo F.C.

Official competitions

Campeonato Paulista

Record

Campeonato Brasileiro

Record

External links
official website 

Association football clubs 1971 season
1971
1971 in Brazilian football